Shimica  Wong (born 9 November 1994) Producer singer-songwriter who She won Best Original Film Song with her single “Let's Dance" from the 2013 film The Way We Dance at the 33rd Hong Kong Film Awards. An independent artist who has now established her own brand & Company  Modest Music Limited

Biography
Wong was born in the Philippines then migrated to Hong Kong at the age of three. She won The Best Original Film Song with her single “Let's Dance" from the 2013 film The Way We Dance at the 33rd Hong Kong Film Awards.  and is in charge of her own label Hybrid Music production and Dynesty Empire.

Among his collaborations, he is alongside Joseph Anthony Somers-Morales, known as SoMo on the remix of "50 Feet" and "Tonight", alongside Chinese DJ and producer, Lizzy Wang. On July 11, 2020, Shimica is the producer of the song "Casada" by Hong Kong actress, singer and dancer, Grace Wong.

Filmography

Discography

Singles as lead artist

Singles as featured artist

Awards and nominations

Notes

References

External links
 

  Shimica Wong at Hong Kong Movie DataBase 

1992 births
Living people
English-language singers from the Philippines
Filipino people of Chinese descent
Cantonese-language singers
Mandarin-language singers
Tagalog-language singers
Hong Kong television actresses
Actresses of Japanese descent
21st-century Filipino singers